Scott Brant (born 26 January 1983) is a Zimbabwean cricketer. He is a right-handed batsman and a left-arm medium-fast bowler. He was born in Harare.

Brant's cricketing career began in the 2001–02 Australian cricket season, where he played for Queensland. Having played in the Pura Cup for two years, winning the competition in 2001/02, he joined Essex the following year. An average of less than 30, and a best bowling tally of 6–45 couldn't save the team from immediate relegation, however.

Brant played frequently through the first half of the 2004 season, before being dropped from the first team. He has since played for Queensland in the Cricket Australia Cup and the County Challenge. Brant is a tailend batsman and a frequent left-handed bowler, who averaged just over 30 in his first season in England.

References

External links
Scott Brant at CricketArchive 

1983 births
Zimbabwean cricketers
Living people
Alumni of St. John's College (Harare)
Queensland cricketers
Essex cricketers